Hamidabad (also Romanized as Ḩamīdābād) is a village in Sharqi Rural District, in the Central District of Ardabil County, Ardabil Province, Iran. At the 2006 census, its population was 75, in 21 families.

References 

Towns and villages in Ardabil County